In drumming, a groove is a repeated phrase that sets and maintains the rhythm and tempo of the piece.

Grooves and fills are the main components of the music played on a drum kit, and together with basic techniques or rudiments such as flams make up the curriculum for learning to play the drum kit.

To a drummer, a groove is the drumming equivalent of a riff to a guitarist.

Examples

Rock music

 Cut time
 Standard rock beat on snare, bass and closed hi-hats

Jazz music

Swing
Cooking on the hi-hat
Shuffle on the ride cymbal
Jazz waltz in 3
Stirring with brushes on the snare drum

Latin
Bossa Nova
Samba

Heavy metal music
Blast beat
Breakdowns
Double bass drum pattern

See also
Groove (music)

Accompaniment
Jazz techniques
Percussion performance techniques
Riffs